Sambaina is the name of several towns and communes in Madagascar. Sambaina (Manjakandriana) belongs to the district of Manjakandriana, which is a part of Analamanga Region. The population of the commune was estimated to be approximately 7,831 in 2018.

Primary and junior level secondary education are available in town. The majority, 85%, of the population of the commune are farmers.  The most important crops are cassava and potatoes, while other important agricultural products are beans and rice. Services provide employment for 15% of the population.

References and notes 

Populated places in Analamanga